Jack Miller (26 January 1899 – 19 March 1957) was a Canadian athlete. He competed in the men's high jump at the 1924 Summer Olympics.

References

External links
 

1899 births
1957 deaths
Athletes (track and field) at the 1924 Summer Olympics
Canadian male high jumpers
Olympic track and field athletes of Canada
People from Kings County, New Brunswick
Sportspeople from New Brunswick